William Park Armstrong (January 10, 1874 – March 25, 1944) was a theologian and New Testament scholar who is best known for his work at Princeton Theological Seminary.

Biography
William Park Armstrong was born in Selma, Alabama, the son of William Park and Alice (née Isbell) Armstrong and studied at Princeton University, earning his bachelor's degree at the age of 20. He would later earn his M.A. from Princeton and a B.D. from Princeton Theological Seminary before studying in Europe. He studied at the German Universities of Marburg, Berlin, and Erlangen, before finally finishing his studies back at Princeton Theological Seminary. In 1900 he was ordained into the Presbyterian Church (USA). During this time he also taught New Testament at Princeton Theological Seminary, until his death in 1944. During his tenure at Princeton, he wrote numerous scholarly articles and pamphlets.   Professor Armstrong also served for many years as a director of City National Bank.  Armstrong Drive in Princeton is named in his honor.

Re-Organization of Princeton Theological Seminary
During the 1920s, the northern Presbyterian church (PCUSA) was criticized by some for tolerating increasingly modernist theology. John Gresham Machen, a fellow professor at Princeton, responded by forming the Orthodox Presbyterian Church as a more orthodox alternative. In response, the PCUSA threatened to reorganize the school. Dr. Armstrong was a friend and ally of Dr. Machen, and supported him until Machen's departure to help found the Westminster Theological Seminary.

Personal
He married Rebekah Sellers Purves on December 8, 1904 and went on to have six children.

Works

Books

Edited by

Notes

1874 births
1944 deaths
19th-century Calvinist and Reformed ministers
20th-century Calvinist and Reformed ministers
20th-century Christian biblical scholars
American biblical scholars
Calvinist and Reformed biblical scholars
New Testament scholars
People from Selma, Alabama
Princeton University alumni